The 1982 Langs Supreme Scottish Masters was a professional non-ranking snooker tournament that took place between 23 and 26 September 1982 at the Holiday Inn in Glasgow, Scotland.

The field of 8 included Scot Eddie Sinclair who was beaten 1–5 in his opening match against Alex Higgins.

Steve Davis won the tournament by defeating Alex Higgins 9–4 in the final, winning the first prize of £9,000. Davis led 6–1 after the afternoon session and extended his lead by winning the first frame of the evening session. Higgins won three of the next four frames before Davis won the match by taking the 13th frame.

Tournament draw

References

1982
Masters
Scottish Masters
Scottish Masters